The Underworld is the second studio album by the American thrash metal band  Evildead, released in June 1991 on Steamhammer Records. While the album was a mild success, it did not maintain the same popularity as Annihilation of Civilization, likely due to its release coinciding with the advent of the grunge era, which ultimately resulted in a dramatic decline in the popularity of heavy metal in general. This would be their final album with founding vocalist Phil Flores (who left in 1993) and their only featuring guitarist Dan Flores (though he would stay in Evildead until their breakup and played on their 1994 demo EP Terror), bassist Karlos Medina (who also left in 1993, although he would return in 2016) and drummer Doug Clawson (who left not long after the album was released).

Although the band had made several attempts to make a third album during early-to-mid 1990s, and again during their initial reunion from 2008 to 2012, The Underworld would be Evildead's last studio album for nearly three decades, until the release of United States of Anarchy in 2020.

Track listing
All tracks by Evildead, except "He's a Woman/She's a Man" by Rudolf Schenker, Klaus Meine, Herman Rarebell

"Intro (Comshell 5)" – 1:34
"Global Warming" – 3:14
"Branded" – 4:44
"Welcome to Kuwait" – 3:44
"Critic/Cynic" – 4:03
"The Hood" – 3:49
"The Underworld" – 4:35
"He's a Woman/She's a Man" (Scorpions cover) – 3:20
"Process Elimination"	– 3:50
"Labyrinth of the Mind" - 4:23
"Reap What You Sow" - 5:19

Credits
Band members
 Phil Flores – lead and backing vocals
 Juan Garcia – guitars, acoustic guitar, backing vocals, producer, cover concept
 Dan Flores – guitars, talk box, backing vocals
 Karlos Medina - bass, backing vocals

Additional musicians
 Doug 'The Claw' Clawson – drums
Gene Hoglan - fade solo on "Welcome to Kuwait"
David Wayne - chorus vocals on "He's a Woman/She's a Man"

Production
Warren Croyle- producer, engineer, mixing
Jeff Park - assistant engineer, mixing
Jack Hayback - assistant engineer
Jeff Weller - executive producer
Edward J. Repka - cover art
Neil Zlozower - photography

References

Evildead albums
1991 albums
SPV/Steamhammer albums
Albums with cover art by Ed Repka
Albums recorded at Sound City Studios